La Sierra is a town and ward (consejo popular) in Encrucijada, Cuba.

Geography
Towns in the ward of La Sierra include:
 El Perico
 Las Bocas
 Vega Redonda
 Pavón

Environmental issues
La Sierra is near the Sagua la Chica River, which has a possible chance to flood, making danger to people who live in La Sierra and El Santo. Incase this happens there are 21 evacuation centers which are always stocked up with food. Including Pavón, El Santo, Siete Pazos, Vega Redonda, and others in Encrucijada it’s a total of a thousand people going to live in there family houses, friends houses, and the evacuation centers when the floods happened in 2018.

Education
Schools in La Sierra include:
 José Arcadio CM
 Enrique Hart Rural Primary School
 Carlos Manuel de Céspedes Rural Primary School
 Camilo Cienfuegos Rural Primary School
 Perucho Figueredo Rural Primary School

Government
Encrucijada has multiple District Delegate (Delegado de la Circunscripción) for every ward, La Sierra’s ward has:
 District Delegate No 39 Grisela Alonso Consuegra
 District Delegate No 40 Mislandy Martínez Consuegra
 District Delegate No 41 Lisbán González Chirino
 District Delegate No 42 Reinier  Guevara Hernández
 District Delegate No 58 Osmany Broche Vega

References

Populated places in Villa Clara Province